Chase Wileman (born June 25, 1986) is an American soccer coach and former player. He is currently the coach of Brown men's soccer.

Career

College
Wileman attended Southern Methodist University, where he majored in Markets & Culture, and featured in over 60 games for the Mustangs during his college career, captaining the side in his senior year.

Professional
Wileman was selected in the 4th round, 45th overall, in the 2007 MLS Supplemental Draft by FC Dallas, and made his full professional debut for them on 1 July 2008, in a US Open Cup third-round game against Miami FC.

He made his Major League Soccer debut as a substitute during a 4-0 victory over Los Angeles Galaxy on July 27, 2008, also registering an assist.

His option was not picked up by FC Dallas after struggling with injury during the 2009 preseason. He has since joined Des Moines Menace of the USL Premier Development League. On May 31, he made his debut with Des Moines in a 2-2 draw with St. Louis but was substituted early because of a hamstring problem.

International
Wileman is a former member of the United States Under-17 side, spending almost 3 years with the Residency program at IMG Academy in Bradenton, Florida.

References

1986 births
Living people
American soccer players
Des Moines Menace players
FC Dallas players
Parade High School All-Americans (boys' soccer)
SMU Mustangs men's soccer players
Major League Soccer players
USL League Two players
United States men's youth international soccer players
FC Dallas draft picks
Soccer players from Texas
Association football midfielders
Association football coaches
Brown Bears men's soccer coaches